Dillard's, Inc. is an upscale American department store chain with approximately 282 stores in 29 states and headquartered in Little Rock, Arkansas. Currently, the largest number of stores are located in Texas with 57 and Florida with 42. The company also has stores in 27 more states; however, it is absent from the Northeast (Washington, D.C., and northward), most of the Upper Midwest (Michigan, Wisconsin, Minnesota), the Northwest, and most of California, aside from three stores.

Operations during 20th century

Early history
Dillard's is the outgrowth of a department store founded in 1938 by William T. Dillard; its corporate headquarters remain located at the eastern edge of Little Rock's Riverdale area and many of its executives and directors are members of the Dillard family. The family retains control of the company through its ownership of Class B Common Stock; the Class A common stock is publicly traded on the New York Stock Exchange.
Dillard began his first store in Mineral Springs, Arkansas, in what was locally known as "the tater house". It was located across the street from the community's Methodist church. The building that housed the original store was torn down in the early 2000s. Dillard sold the original five and dime store in Nashville, Arkansas, to develop a department store in Texarkana, Arkansas, initially as the minority partner in Wooten & Dillard. In 1956, Dillard led an investment group that acquired the Mayer & Schmidt store in Tyler, Texas. This store eventually took on the name "Dillard's Mayer & Schmidt" until 1974, when it was replaced with a mall-based location south of downtown Tyler.

In 1960, Dillard acquired and turned around the failing Brown-Duncan store in Tulsa, Oklahoma. The success of this turnaround was followed in late 1963 by acquiring the Joseph Pfeifer store in Little Rock, Arkansas, and in early 1964 acquiring the other main store in Little Rock, Gus Blass Co. Dillard used this as an opportunity to relocate his headquarters to Little Rock. In 1969, Dillard and his investors took Dillard Department Stores, Inc., public on the American Stock Exchange.

1970–1989

Thereafter, the chain expanded rapidly as an anchor in suburban shopping malls, and took advantage of market conditions to acquire smaller chains as well as its ability to turn around locations that other companies could not operate profitably. Expansion of the Dillard's chain increased rapidly during the 1970s, mainly through expanding into new malls being built in smaller cities in Texas. In 1971 five Texas units were acquired from Fedway, a division of Federated Department Stores (the stores were rebadged as Dillard's in 1972). In 1974, five Leonard's stores were acquired in Fort Worth, Texas, as well as a commitment to open a new downtown Fort Worth store at the Tandy Center (site of the original Leonard's). Also in 1974, the former Brown-Dunkin, Blass, Pfeifer and Mayer & Schmidt stores were fully renamed Dillard's.

The 1980s brought the purchase of many local chains. In 1982, Dillard's leased three units of the defunct Lowenstein's chain in Memphis, Tennessee. In early 1984, Dillard's acquired 12 Stix, Baer & Fuller stores in St. Louis and Kansas City from Associated Dry Goods Corp., while in fall 1984 two department store divisions were purchased from Dayton-Hudson Corporation: Diamond's and John A. Brown, with locations in Arizona, Nevada and Oklahoma. Twelve stores in Kansas and Missouri belonging to R. H. Macy & Co.'s Midwest Division, which was later dissolved in 2006, were acquired in early 1986, while the three-unit Hemphill-Wells company in West Texas was purchased in the summer. The stores at Sunset Mall in San Angelo and South Plains Mall in Lubbock were both converted, while the third in downtown Lubbock was closed.

In 1987, Dillard's purchased 26 of Joske's 27 stores in Texas and Arizona as well as the four-unit Cain-Sloan chain in Nashville, Tennessee, from Allied Stores Corp.  This deal gave Dillard's two major anchor locations at several malls in Texas and Arizona with many of the second locations being converted to a separate, expanded home and men's stores, a format that Dillard's utilized greatly, both to grow its store size cost-effectively and to prevent competitors from gaining valuable real estate. Additionally, the Joske's acquisition gave Dillard's entry into the Houston market.  That same year, Dillard's co-founded CDI Contractors, a construction company that would help build, remodel, and repair most of its locations, with William "Bill" Clark and Braggs Electric Construction Company.

Dillard's in 1988 acquired the former Selber Bros. clothing department store chain, founded in 1907 in Shreveport, Louisiana, which also had a few locations in Texas.

In 1988, Dillard's purchased the three-unit Miller & Paine chain in Lincoln, Nebraska, as well as more significantly, a half-interest and operational control of The Higbee Co., based in Cleveland, Ohio, with partner Edward J. DeBartolo Corp. D. H. Holmes Co., Ltd., of New Orleans, was purchased in 1989, bringing 18 units primarily in Louisiana, as well two former Diamond's units in Tucson, Arizona.

1990–1999

The Ivey's chain of 23 stores in Florida, North Carolina and South Carolina was acquired from BATUS in 1990. This was followed by Maison Blanche selling eight stores on Florida's Gulf Coast to them in 1991. The locations were at Tyrone Square Mall (1973), University Square Mall, WestShore Plaza (both 1974), Countryside Mall (1976), Southgate Plaza (1978), Edison Mall, Coastland Center (both 1985), and Lakeland Square Mall (1988). In 1992, the remaining interest in the Higbee's stores was acquired, as well as five Ohio stores from Horne's (as part of a legal settlement, Dillard's having canceled a 1988 deal to acquire the chain). Also in 1992, three stores from the Hess's chain liquidation (five other former Hess's were acquired in 1994), two E. M. Scarbrough's locations in Austin, Texas, two  Thalhimer's in South Carolina and Tennessee, a former Lord & Taylor store at Oak Court Mall in Memphis, Tennessee and three Belk-Lindsey stores in Florida (Gulf View, DeSoto, and Eastlake). Except for two Belk of Columbia stores that were acquired in 1995, acquisitions were eschewed for a couple of years until early 1997 with the purchase of 15 stores—10 Mervyn's boxes in Florida and five southern Virginia stores from Proffitt's that were acquired from Hess's in 1993. The Mervyn's deal included 5 purchased from Lord & Taylor in 1991--Cutler Ridge Mall (1982), Coral Square (1984), Miami International Mall, Boynton Beach Mall (both 1985), and Treasure Coast Square (1987)--along with 3 acquired from Jordan Marsh in 1992--Pompano Fashion Square (1970), Broward Mall (1978), and Melbourne Square (1983)--and the remaining 2 at Lakeland Square Mall (1986) and Pembroke Lakes Mall (1992). The Proffitt's conversion gave them 2 that were also taken over from Rices Nachmans in 1985 at Coliseum Mall (1973) and Pembroke Mall (1981), and 3 newly built stores Patrick Henry Mall, Greenbrier Mall (both 1987), and Chesapeake Square (1988). Three suburban Macy's stores in Houston at Willowbrook Mall, Deerbrook Mall (both 1984), and Baybrook Mall (1985) were absorbed while the location at The Galleria (1986) was not affected.

The deal-making culminated with the purchase of Mercantile Stores Co., Inc., in 1998. The purchase of this Fairfield, Ohio-based department store company brought several chains, including Bacon's, Castner Knott, de Lendrecie's, Gayfers, Glass Block, Hennessy's, J.B. White, Joslins, Lion Store, Maison Blanche, McAlpin's, Root's and The Jones Store. Dillard's sold 26 stores of the former Mercantile Stores to May Department Stores Co. and Saks Incorporated and traded an additional seven stores to Belk for nine of theirs in southern Virginia and Chattanooga, Tennessee. Overall this deal enabled Dillard's to enhance its position in several markets in the South, Midwest and Mountain states.

Also in 1998, the chain entered California, opening its first store in a former Weinstock's at Weberstown Mall in Stockton, California. In 1999, Dillard's opened stores at Mall of Georgia and Arbor Place Mall near Atlanta, Georgia.

Operations during 21st century

After the acquisition of Mercantile, Dillard's ceased expanding through acquisitions, although eight locations of the defunct Montgomery Ward in the Midwest, and four locations from ZCMI in Utah and Idaho were acquired in 2001, when stores opened at Chandler Fashion Center in Chandler, Arizona, The Mall at Stonecrest in Lithonia, Georgia, The Mall at Wellington Green in Wellington, Florida, International Plaza and Bay Street in Tampa, Florida, and The Shops at Willow Bend in Plano, Texas.

In 2004, Dillard's store credit card operation, operated as Dillard's National Bank, was sold to GE Money Bank. Customers can now be issued Dillard's/American Express cards as well the traditional Dillard's store charge. These cards can be used at any store that accepts the American Express brand.

In 2005, Dillard's opened stores at Perimeter Mall and Atlantic Station in Atlanta, Georgia as well as St. Johns Town Center in Jacksonville, Florida.

In 2008, Dillard's closed their travel agency, Dillard's Travel, alongside all in-store locations due to economic conditions. Dillard's Travel previously operated in 43 of the 318 stores. Also in 2008, stores opened at both The Shops at Wiregrass and Pier Park in Florida. Additionally, Dillard's announced that it had completed a transaction to acquire the remaining fifty percent (50%) interest in CDI Contractors, LLC and CDI Contractors, Inc., which it did not already own.

In late 2018, Dillard's announced a location would open in fall 2019 in Sioux Falls, South Dakota, at the site of the former Younkers in Empire Mall. By August 2020, it had not yet opened. In September 2019, Dillard's remained headquartered in Arkansas, with 260 "full-line" stores and 29 clearance centers. It had locations mostly in the South and Southwest of the United States, in 29 states overall. The company was also a significant owner of property in the United States, and it owned 44.3 million square feet of the 49 million square feet it used for its business and retail operations.

In March 2020, Dillard's attracted note in the press for keeping many of its 290 stores in the United States open during the coronavirus pandemic, with Dillard's stating "we are open with limited hours where not ordered to close by state or local government mandate." In April 2020, Dillard's closed around 200 out of its 285 stores in response to Covid-19. Its online store remained open. In May 2020, Dillard's had reopened all but two of its locations in Tampa Bay, according to its website at the time. That week, management and Dillard's CEO, William Dillard II, informed its annual meeting that the company's first quarter had been the worst in its history, due to the coronavirus, saying Dillard's business had become "total chaos" by the end of April as a result. At the time, Dillard's had 257 department stores, and 28 clearance stores, and had reopened stores in 21 states or more.

In August 2021, the company released its second quarter report. It did not release "store comps relative to pandemic-dominated 2020; comparable store retail sales compared to 2019 rose 14%." After an $8.6 million net loss in August 2020, the company noted that it instead had made a net income in August 2021 of  $185.7 million.

Store formats

The chain continues to expand and has recently added stores in non-traditional mall shopping centers. Within the Dallas/Fort Worth area, the chain has two flagship stores with a  store at the Northpark Center in Dallas and a  store at the North East Mall in Hurst. It announced construction of a new "flagship" store in Lubbock, TX on Nov 15th, 2022. This store will be 220,000 sq ft. The home store for the chain is in Little Rock; the divided store is located in the trend-conscious Park Plaza Mall, one of the city's oldest continuously operating shopping centers in its midtown section.

Clearance Centers

As of April 2020, Dillard's operated 28 clearance stores in the United States. Dillard's Clearance Centers occupy 26 mall spaces throughout multiple states for the clearance stock of clothing from prior seasons. They are usually located within lower-income areas as the no longer high priced items are not as covetable for the general clientele Dillard's procures. The 265 regular department stores ship the clearance clothing at already 65% off to these Clearance Centers where the clothing is then marked down further to liquidate the heaps of clothing and shoes. The Clearance Centers rival that of a Marshalls or TJ Maxx with unknown sizes or quantities of a specific item. However, all the clothing at Dillard's Clearance Centers are direct from the normal Dillard's Department Stores close to and surrounding the one outlet. The goods that are sent to these stores are including, but not limited to: overstocked, offseason, didn't sell well, or damaged. This is an easy way to buy all of the brand-specific items at a cheaper, more economical price.

The hours may vary a little bit by store or holiday; however, the generic hours of a Clearance Center are Tuesday through Saturday from 12 pm to 7 pm and Sunday from 12 pm to 6 pm. On Mondays, the Clearance Centers are closed for the restocking of the Clearance items.

On a week-to-week basis, each Dillard's Clearance Center receives further markdowns by each department, i. e. older merchandise will be marked down to an amount ending in “99 cents” that is lower than the price at 65% off.

References

External links

 Dillard's Official Website
 Dillard's Company History
 More Dillard's History from NYJobSource

Companies based in Little Rock, Arkansas
Culture of the Southern United States
Economy of the Southeastern United States
Culture of the Western United States
Economy of the Western United States
Clothing retailers of the United States
Department stores of the United States
Companies listed on the New York Stock Exchange
Retail companies established in 1938
1938 establishments in Arkansas
Family-owned companies of the United States